The 30th Toronto International Film Festival ran from September 8–17 and screened 335 films from 52 countries - 109 of these films were world premieres, and 78 were North American premieres.

Awards
At the Festival's closing event, the following prizes were awarded:
 The People's Choice Award, presented to Gavin Hood's Tsotsi.
 The Discovery Award, presented to Sarah Watt's Look Both Ways.
 The Fipresci Prize, presented to South Korean director Kang Yi-kwan for Sa-kwa.
 A tie for the Citytv Award for Best Canadian First Feature, presented to Louise Archambault's Familia and Michael Mabbott's The Life and Hard Times of Guy Terrifico.
 The Toronto – City Award for Best Canadian Feature Film, presented to C.R.A.Z.Y. directed by Jean-Marc Vallée.
 The Bravo!FACT Short Cuts Canada Award, presented to Renuka Jeyapalan's Big Girl (Honourable mention to Andrea Dorfman's There's a Flower in My Pedal).

Because the vote for the People's Choice Award was so close, at the awards ceremony Piers Handling (festival co-director) announced four runners-up. However, in the subsequent reporting there was confusion about the order of the runners-up. As reported by ScreenDaily, the results of the People's Choice Award voting was as follows:
winner - Tsotsi (dir. Gavin Hood)
2nd place - Live and Become (dir. Radu Mihaileanu)
3rd place - Dreamer: Inspired By A True Story (dir. John Gatins)
4th place - Brokeback Mountain (dir. Ang Lee)
5th place - Mother of Mine (dir. Klaus Härö)

Certain other publications indicated (probably erroneously) that the order of the runners-up was reversed, with Mother of Mine finishing second to Tsotsi.

Screenings

Canada First
 The Cabin Movie, Dylan Akio Smith
 Drifting States (Les États nordiques), Denis Côté
 Eve and the Fire Horse, Julia Kwan
 Familia, Louise Archambault
 Fetching Cody, David Ray
 The Life and Hard Times of Guy Terrifico, Michael Mabbott
 Saint Martyrs of the Damned (Saint-Martyrs-des-Damnés), Robin Aubert
 A Simple Curve, Aubrey Nealon
 Six Figures, David Christensen
 These Girls, John Hazlett

Canadian Open Vault
 Between Salt and Sweet Water (Entre la mer et l'eau douce), Michel Brault

Canadian Retrospective
Featuring Don Owen
 Cowboy and Indian
 The Ernie Game
 Gallery: A View of Time
 High Steel
 Ladies and Gentlemen... Mr. Leonard Cohen
 Monique Leyrac in Concert
 Nobody Waved Good-bye
 Notes for a Film About Donna and Gail
 Partners
 Richler of St. Urbain Street
 Runner
 Snow in Venice
 Toronto Jazz
 Turnabout
 Unfinished Business
 You Don't Back Down

Contemporary World Cinema
06/05: The Sixth of May, Theo van Gogh
Adam's Apples, Anders Thomas Jensen
All Souls, Ger Beukenkamp, Peter de Baan, Mijke de Jong, Constant Dullaart, Rita Horst, David Lammers, Tim Oliehoek, Rob Schröder, Hanro Smitsman, Norbert ter Hall, Eddy Terstall, Maarten Treurniet, Meral Uslu, Marco van Geffen, Michiel van Jaarsveld, Nicole van Kilsdonk, Mariecke van der Linden, Gerrard Verhage.
American Gun, Aric Avelino
Amu, Shonali Bose
Angel Rodriguez, Jim McKay
Backstage, Emmanuelle Bercot
Battle in Heaven, Carlos Reygadas
Border Café, Kambuzia Partovi
Brooklyn Lobster, Kevin Jordan (filmmaker)
C.R.A.Z.Y., Jean-Marc Vallée
Citizen Dog, Wisit Sasanatieng
Dear Wendy, Thomas Vinterberg
The Death of Mr. Lazarescu, Cristi Puiu
Dodging the Clock (Horloge biologique), Ricardo Trogi
Douches froides, Antony Cordier
Dreaming of Space, Alexey Uchitel
Eleven Men Out, Róbert I. Douglas
The Fatalist, João Botelho
The French Guy, Ann Marie Fleming
Good Girl, Sophie Fillières
Gilane, Rakhshan Bani-Etemad, Mohsen Abdolvahab
The Grönholm Method, Marcelo Piñeyro
I'm the Angel of Death - Pusher III, Nicolas Winding Refn
Iron Island, Mohammad Rasoulof
The Last Hangman, Adrian Shergold
Linda Linda Linda, Nobuhiro Yamashita
Life with My Father (La Vie avec mon père), Sébastien Rose
Lucid, Sean Garrity
Mario's War, Antonio Capuano
Marock, Laïla Marrakchi
Mother of Mine, Klaus Härö
The Novena (La Neuvaine), Bernard Émond
October 17, 1961, Alain Tasma
One Last Thing . . ., Alex Steyermark
Opa!, Udayan Prasad
Paradise Now, Hany Abu-Assad
The Passion of Joshua the Jew, Pasquale Scimeca
Perpetual Motion, Ning Ying
The President's Last Bang, Im Sang-soo
Pusher, Nicolas Winding Refn
River Queen, Vincent Ward
Riviera, Anne Villacèque
Runaway, Tim McCann
Shadowboxer, Lee Daniels
Shanghai Dreams, Wang Xiaoshuai
Shooting Dogs, Michael Caton-Jones
Something Like Happiness, Bohdan Sláma
Sud Express, Chema de la Peña, Gabriel Velázquez
Summer in Berlin, Andreas Dresen
Sunflower, Zhang Yang
Le Temps qui reste, François Ozon
Transamerica, Duncan Tucker
À travers la forêt, Jean Paul Civeyrac
Tsotsi, Gavin Hood
12 and Holding, Michael Cuesta
U-Carmen e-Khayelitsha, Mark Dornford-May
Va, Vis et Deviens, Radu Mihaileanu
Viva Cuba, Juan Carlos Cremata Malberti
Whole New Thing, Amnon Buchbinder
The Willow Tree, Majid Majidi
With Blood on My Hands - Pusher II, Nicolas Winding Refn

Dialogues: Talking With Pictures
Ghosts… of the Civil Dead, John Hillcoat
Liza with a 'Z', Bob Fosse
Midnight Movies: From the Margin to the Mainstream, Stuart Samuels
My Dad Is 100 Years Old, Guy Maddin
Rome, Open City, Roberto Rossellini
Stranded In Canton, William Eggleston, Robert Gordon
The Wild, Wild Rose, Wong Tin Lam
William Eggleston in the Real World, Michael Almereyda

Discovery
7 Virgins, Alberto Rodríguez
Bam Bam and Celeste, Lorene Machado
Benares, Barlen Pyamootoo
Conversations on a Sunday Afternoon, Khalo Matabane
Dam Street, Li Yu
Day Break, Hamid Rahmanian
Do U Cry 4 Me Argentina?, Bae Youn-suk
Dreaming Lhasa, Ritu Sarin, Tenzing Sonam
Festival, Annie Griffin
Kinetta, Yorgos Lanthimos
Little Athens, Tom Zuber
Look Both Ways, Sarah Watt
The Masseur, Brillante Mendoza
Pavee Lackeen, Perry Ogden
A Perfect Day, Joana Hadjithomas, Khalil Joreige
Sa-kwa, Kang Yi-Kwan
Shark in the Head, Maria Procházková
The Shore, Dionysius Zervos
Sisters, Julia Solomonoff
Someone Else's Happiness, Fien Troch
Sorry, Haters, Jeff Stanzler
Stoned, Stephen Woolley
Time Off, Francisca Schweitzer, Pablo Solís
The War Within, Joseph Castelo
You Bet Your Life, Antonin Svoboda

Masters
Breakfast on Pluto, Neil Jordan
Brokeback Mountain, Ang Lee
Bubble, Steven Soderbergh
Caché, Michael Haneke
L'Enfant, Jean-Pierre Dardenne, Luc Dardenne
Free Zone, Amos Gitai
Iberia, Carlos Saura
Manderlay, Lars von Trier
Memories In The Mist, Budhdhadeb Dasgupta
Memory for Max, Claire, Ida and Company, Allan King
No Direction Home: Bob Dylan, Martin Scorsese
Obaba, Montxo Armendáriz
The Sun, Alexander Sokurov
Takeshis', Takeshi Kitano
Three Times, Hou Hsiao-hsien
Tideland, Terry Gilliam

Mavericks
 Mavericks: Albert Maysles
 Mavericks: Ivan Reitman
 Mavericks: Laurie Anderson
 Mavericks: Nick Park

Midnight Madness
Bangkok Loco, Pornchai Hongrattanaporn
Banlieue 13, Pierre Morel
The District!, Áron Gauder
Evil Aliens, Jake West
The Great Yokai War, Takashi Miike
Hostel, Eli Roth
Isolation, Billy O'Brien
Metal: A Headbanger's Journey, Sam Dunn, Scot McFadyen, Jessica Joy Wise
Sarah Silverman: Jesus Is Magic, Liam Lynch
SPL: Sha Po Lang, Wilson Yip

Real To Reel
3 Friends, Mingmongkol Sonakul, Aditya Assarat, Pumin Chinaradee
51 Birch Street, Doug Block
a/k/a Tommy Chong, Josh Gilbert
All About Darfur, Taghreed Elsanhouri
Ballets Russes, Dan Geller, Dayna Goldfine
Black Bull, Pedro González-Rubio, Carlos Armella
Black Sun, Gary Tarn
China Blue, Micha Peled
A Conversation with Basquiat, Tamra Davis
The Devil and Daniel Johnston, Jeff Feuerzig
Diameter of the Bomb, Steven Silver, Andrew Quigley
The Giant Buddhas, Christian Frei
The Heart of the Game, Ward Serrill
Into Great Silence, Philip Groening
John & Jane, Ashim Ahluwalia
Leonard Cohen: I'm Your Man, Lian Lunson
Overcoming, Tómas Gislason
Pick Up the Mic, Alex Hinton
Sisters in Law, Kim Longinotto, Florence Ayisi
The Smell of Paradise, Mariusz Pilis, Marcin Mamon
Souvenir of Canada, Robin Neinstein
Twelve Disciples of Nelson Mandela, Thomas Allen Harris
We Feed the World, Erwin Wagenhofer
The Well, Kristian Petri
Why We Fight, Eugene Jarecki
Workingman's Death, Michael Glawogger
Zizek!, Astra Taylor

Short Cuts Canada
Une Âme nue glisse à l'eau vive, Denis Chabot
The Argument (A 'Burnt Toast' Opera), Larry Weinstein
At the Quinte Hotel, Bruce Alcock
Benediction, Tess Girard
Berlin, Sarah Galea-Davis
Big Girl, Renuka Jeyapalan
Claude, Stéphane Lafleur, Louis-David Morasse
cNote, Christopher Hinton
Day of John, Christopher R. Nash
Dumb Angel, Deco Dawson
The First Day of My Life, David Uloth
A Half Man, Firas Momani
Hide, Byron Lamarque
Hiro, Matthew Swanson
Lake, Ryan Redford
Leo, David Hyde
Letters From R, Ross Turnbull
Liberté conditionnelle, Constant Mentzas
A Little Death - Cut Keith Cole, Michael Caines, Keith Cole
Mixed Signals, Richard Martin
My Uncle Navy and Other Inherited Disorders, Adam Swica
Noise, Greg Spottiswood
One Balloon, Aram Hekinian, Aruna Naimji
Patterns, Jamie Travis
Phone Call From Imaginary Girlfriend: Ankara, Don McKellar
Phone Call From Imaginary Girlfriend: Istanbul, Don McKellar
The Racist Brick, Adam Brodie, Dave Derewlany
Room 710, Ann Marie Fleming
Red (Le Rouge au sol), Maxime Giroux
Shoulders on a Map, Jason Britski
Still Life, Jon Knautz
Tell Me, Shandi Mitchell
There's a Flower in My Pedal, Andrea Dorfman
Troll Concerto, Alexandre Franchi
The True Story of Sawney Beane, Elizabeth Hobbs
Unlocked, Sook-Yin Lee
Unwritten..., Kaare Andrews
Vancouver, Jesse McKeown
Waiting, Jamie M. Dagg
The Waldo Cumberbund Story, Simon Ennis
what's up with the kids?, Simon Davidson
The White Chapel (Une chapelle blanche), Simon Lavoie
The Wrong Number, Adam Brodie, Dave Derewlany
Yesterday in Rwanda, Davina Pardo

Special Presentations
3 Needles, Thom Fitzgerald
All the Invisible Children, Mehdi Charef, Emir Kusturica, Spike Lee, Kátia Lund, Jordan and Sir Ridley Scott, Stefano Veneruso, John Woo
Les Amants Réguliers, Philippe Garrel
April Snow, Hur Jin-ho
Art Project: Ghosts of Woodrow, Graeme Patterson
Bee Season, Scott McGehee, David Siegel
Beowulf & Grendel, Sturla Gunnarsson
Capote, Bennett Miller
Dave Chappelle's Block Party, Michel Gondry
Entre ses mains, Anne Fontaine
Everlasting Regret, Stanley Kwan
Everything Is Illuminated, Liev Schreiber
Fateless, Lajos Koltai
Harsh Times, David Ayer
The House of Sand, Andrucha Waddington
Imagine Me and You, Ol Parker
Kiss Kiss, Bang Bang, Shane Black
Little Fish, Rowan Woods
A Little Trip to Heaven, Baltasar Kormákur
Mistress of Spices, Paul Mayeda Berges
Nanook of the North, Robert J. Flaherty
Neverwas, Joshua Michael Stern
The Notorious Bettie Page, Mary Harron
Oliver Twist, Roman Polanski
Romance & Cigarettes, John Turturro
Seven Swords, Tsui Hark
Shopgirl, Anand Tucker
Sketches of Frank Gehry, Sydney Pollack
Slow Burn, Wayne Beach
The Squid and the Whale, Noah Baumbach
Sympathy for Lady Vengeance, Park Chan-wook
Thank You for Smoking, Jason Reitman
Thumbsucker, Mike Mills
Tim Burton's Corpse Bride, Tim Burton, Mike Johnson
Tristram Shandy: A Cock and Bull Story, Michael Winterbottom
Trust the Man, Bart Freundlich
Vers Le Sud, Laurent Cantet
Wah-Wah, Richard E. Grant
Winter Passing, Adam Rapp
The World's Fastest Indian, Roger Donaldson
Zozo, Josef Fares

Viacom Galas
Dreamer: Inspired by a True Story, John Gatins
Edison, David J. Burke
Elizabethtown, Cameron Crowe
L'Enfer, Danis Tanović
A History of Violence, David Cronenberg
In Her Shoes, Curtis Hanson
The Matador, Richard Shepard
Mrs. Harris, Phyllis Nagy
Mrs Henderson Presents, Stephen Frears
The Myth, Stanley Tong
North Country, Niki Caro
Pride & Prejudice, Joe Wright
Proof, John Madden
Revolver, Guy Ritchie
The Three Burials of Melquiades Estrada, Tommy Lee Jones
Walk the Line, James Mangold
Wallace & Gromit: The Curse of the Were-Rabbit, Steve Box, Nick Park
Water, Deepa Mehta
Where the Truth Lies, Atom Egoyan
The White Masai, Hermine Huntgeburth

Visions
50 Ways of Saying Fabulous, Stewart Main
L'Anullaire, Diane Bertrand
Attente, Rashid Masharawi
Be with Me, Eric Khoo
Bed Stories, Kirill Serebrennikov
Brothers of the Head, Keith Fulton, Louis Pepe
Un Couple parfait, Nobuhiro Suwa
Delicate Crime, Beto Brant
Drawing Restraint 9, Matthew Barney
Duelist, Lee Myung-se
Fallen, Fred Kelemen
The Forsaken Land, Vimukthi Jayasundara
Frankie, Fabienne Berthaud
Gabrielle, Patrice Chéreau
I Am, Dorota Kędzierzawska
Lie with Me, Clement Virgo
Mary, Abel Ferrara
Monobloc, Luis Ortega
The Piano Tuner of Earthquakes, Timothy Quay, Stephen Quay
The Porcelain Doll, Péter Gárdos
The Proposition, John Hillcoat
The Quiet, Jamie Babbit
Les Saignantes, Jean-Pierre Bekolo
La Trahison, Philippe Faucon
Twilight, Victoria Gamburg
Wassup Rockers, Larry Clark
The Wayward Cloud, Tsai Ming-liang

Wavelengths
(Re)collection, Arshia Haq
Aerial, Margaret Tait
Album, Matthias Müller
Black Belt Test Exposure, Lynn Marie Kirby
Close Quarters, Jim Jennings
Douro, Faina Fluvial, Manoel de Oliveira
Essex Street Market, Ernie Gehr
Fugitive L(i)ght, Izabella Pruska-Oldenhof
Greene Street, Ernie Gehr
Half-Moon for Margaret, Ute Aurand
India, Ute Aurand
Instructions for a Light and Sound Machine, Peter Tscherkassky
Lapse Lose All, Kathryn MacKay, Alexi Manis
Mouse Heaven, Kenneth Anger
Noon Time Activities, Ernie Gehr
not a matter of if but when, The Speculative Archive
Pyramid Lake Piaute Reservation Exposure, Lynn Marie Kirby
Ruby Skin, Eve Heller
Shape Shift, Scott Stark
site specific LAS VEGAS 05, Olivo Barbieri
site specific ROMA 04, Olivo Barbieri
SSHTOORRTY, Michael Snow
Wavelength, Michael Snow
Workers Leaving the Factory (After Lumière), Ernie Gehr

Canada's Top Ten
In December, TIFF released its annual Canada's Top Ten list of the films programmers had selected as the ten best Canadian films of the year. These were screened as a followup "Canada's Top Ten" minifestival in early 2006, with public screenings in Toronto, Ottawa, Montreal and Vancouver.

C.R.A.Z.Y., Jean-Marc Vallée
Dodging the Clock (Horloge biologique), Ricardo Trogi
Familia, Louise Archambault
A History of Violence, David Cronenberg
The Life and Hard Times of Guy Terrifico, Michael Mabbott
Memory for Max, Claire, Ida and Company, Allan King
The Novena (La Neuvaine), Bernard Émond
A Simple Curve, Aubrey Nealon
Water, Deepa Mehta
Where the Truth Lies, Atom Egoyan

References

External links

 Official website
 2005 Toronto International Film Festival at IMDb

2005
2005 film festivals
2005 in Toronto
2005 in Canadian cinema
2005 festivals in North America